The 2019–20 Midland Football League season was the 6th in the history of the Midland Football League, a football competition in England. The allocations for Steps 1 to 6 for season 2019–20 were announced by the FA on 19 May. These were subject to appeal, and the Midland Football League's constitution was subject to ratification at the league's AGM on 8 June.

As a result of the COVID-19 pandemic, this season's competition was formally abandoned on 26 March 2020, with all results from the season being expunged, and no promotion or relegation taking place to, from, or within the competition. On 30 March 2020, sixty-six non-league clubs sent an open letter to the Football Association requesting that they reconsider their decision.

Premier Division

The Premier Division featured 13 clubs which competed in the previous season, along with seven new clubs:
 Gresley, relegated from the Northern Premier League
 Haughmond, promoted from the West Midlands (Regional) League
 Heather St John's, promoted from Division One
 Newark Flowserve, promoted from the East Midlands Counties League
 Racing Club Warwick, promoted from Division One
 Selston, promoted from the East Midlands Counties League
 Tividale, promoted from the West Midlands (Regional) League

League table

Results

Stadia and locations

Division One

Division One featured 16 clubs which competed in the previous season, along with four new clubs:
 Ashby Ivanhoe, transferred from East Midlands Counties League
 GNP Sports, promoted from Division Two
 Kirby Muxloe, relegated from the United Counties League
 Stafford Town, promoted from the Staffordshire County Senior League

League table

Results

Stadia and locations

Division Two

Division Two featured 15 clubs which competed in the previous season, along with one new club:
 Alcester Town, promoted from Division Three

Also, Moor Green Academy changed name to Solihull United.

League table

Division Three

Division Three featured 13 clubs which competed in the division last season, along with 3 new clubs:
Sutton United, joined from the Birmingham & District League
Welland, joined from the Gloucestershire Northern Senior League
Upton Town, joined from the Cheltenham & District League

League table

References

External links
 Midland Football League

2019-20
9
Association football events curtailed and voided due to the COVID-19 pandemic